Sarala may refer to:

People
 Kovai Sarala, Indian actress
 Sarala Dasa, Oriya poet and scholar
 Sarala Devi Chaudhurani (1872–1945), founder of Bharat Stree Mahamandal
 Sarala Devi (1904–1986), Indian activist, feminist, and writer
 Sarala Kariyawasam, Sri Lankan actress
 Sarala Regmi, Nepalese politician
 Sarala Roy (died 1946), Indian educationist
 Sarala Yeolekar, veteran actress of Marathi, Hindi, and Gujarati Cinema

Other
 Sarala, Ahmednagar, Shrirampur, Ahmednagar, Maharashtra
 Sarala (film), a 1936 Indian film
 Sarala Birla Academy, a boarding school near Bangalore, India
 Sarala Temple, a Hindu Temple in Jagatsinghpur, Orissa